Jovan Šarčević (Serbian Cyrillic: Јован Шарчевић; January 7, 1966 – November 26, 2015) was a Serbian football player.

He died on November 26, 2015, in Kuwait City.

Club career
Šarčević started his career with Proleter Zrenjanin in 1985, where he stayed until 1991 and played a total of 137 official matches in all competitions. He later played for FC Seoul (then known as the LG Cheetahs) of the South Korean K League between 1994 and 1995, making a total of 35 appearances in all competitions. He had a trial with Pusan I'cons at the end of 1999, but failed to join the club.

References

External links
 
 Player profile at Srbijafudbal
 Photograph at LG Cheetahs

1966 births
2015 deaths
Sportspeople from Zrenjanin
Serbian expatriate footballers
Serbian footballers
Yugoslav footballers
FK Proleter Zrenjanin players
FK Vojvodina players
FC Seoul players
K League 1 players
Expatriate footballers in South Korea
FK Spartak Subotica players
Association football defenders
Serbian expatriate sportspeople in South Korea